Lacul Negru (meaning the black lake) is a natural salt lake in the town of Ocna Sibiului, Sibiu County, Transylvania, Romania. It is one of the many lakes of the Ocna Sibiului mine, a large salt mine which has one of the largest salt reserves in Romania.

Name 
The lake's name is The Black Lake, because the lake has mud at its bottom, making its water black. The salt mine only has two lakes with mud: Lacul Negru and Lacul cu Nămol (meaning the lake with mud).

History 
Lacul Negru originates from three small salt lakes.

Information 
Surface: 
Maximum depth: ~1 m
Salinity: 280 g/l

Lakes of the salt mine 
 Auster 
 Lake Avram Iancu-Ocniţa
 Balta cu Nămol 
 Brâncoveanu 
 Cloşca 
 Crişan
 Lacul Fără Fund 
 Gura Minei 
 Horea 
 Mâţelor 
 Negru
 Pânzelor 
 Rândunica 
 Verde (Freshwater lake)
 Vrăjitoarelor (Freshwater lake)

References 

Lakes of Sibiu County